Michael Edward Heydon (July 15, 1874 in Missouri – October 13, 1913 in Indianapolis, Indiana), was a professional baseball player who played catcher in the Major Leagues in -. He played for the Chicago White Sox, Washington Senators (NL), Washington Senators (AL), Baltimore Orioles, and St. Louis Cardinals.

External links

1874 births
1913 deaths
Major League Baseball catchers
Washington Senators (1891–1899) players
Chicago White Sox players
Washington Senators (1901–1960) players
Baltimore Orioles (NL) players
St. Louis Cardinals players
19th-century baseball players
Norfolk Jewels players
Reading Actives players
Reading Coal Heavers players
Indianapolis Hoosiers (minor league) players
Little Rock Travelers players
Indianapolis Indians players
Baseball players from Missouri